Donneil Mike Moukanza (born 27 February 1993 in Paris) is a French footballer who plays as a forward for Maltese club Hamrun Spartans.

Career

Moukanza started his career with Nancy B.

References

 
 

1991 births
Living people
French footballers
French expatriate footballers
SAS Épinal players
US Ivry players
FCM Aubervilliers players
Paris FC players
Olympique de Valence players
FC Zbrojovka Brno players
PFC Slavia Sofia players
Aris Limassol FC players
Barnet F.C. players
Ħamrun Spartans F.C. players
ASOA Valence players
Cypriot First Division players
Czech First League players
First Professional Football League (Bulgaria) players
Maltese Premier League players
Championnat National 2 players
Championnat National 3 players
Footballers from Paris
Association football forwards
French expatriate sportspeople in the Czech Republic
French expatriate sportspeople in Bulgaria
French expatriate sportspeople in Cyprus
French expatriate sportspeople in England
French expatriate sportspeople in Malta
Expatriate footballers in the Czech Republic
Expatriate footballers in Bulgaria
Expatriate footballers in Cyprus
Expatriate footballers in England
Expatriate footballers in Malta